Faringdon railway station is a closed stone and brick built railway station that served the market town of Faringdon, in Oxfordshire, England and was on the Faringdon branch line.

History
The line was opened on 1 June 1864, between Faringdon and the Great Western Railway (GWR) at Uffington, with construction funded by a consortium of local business men called the Faringdon Railway Company which was purchased outright by the GWR in 1886. Constructed as a broad gauge line it was converted to standard gauge in 1878. Passenger traffic peaked in 1913, but later declined to such an extent that the passenger service was withdrawn on 31 December 1951. Freight traffic continued to use the line until 1964.

Faringdon Town Council proposed in 2005 to reopen the line but it remains closed.

The station building is still extant, having been used for various commercial purposes; it has been a children's nursery since 2002.

References

External links
Faringdon Station in the 1950s
Faringdon Station on a navigable 1946 O. S. map

Disused railway stations in Oxfordshire
Former Great Western Railway stations
Railway stations in Great Britain opened in 1864
Railway stations in Great Britain closed in 1951
Faringdon